Crystal Ann Williams (born 1970) is an American university president, educator, and poet. Williams is the current President of Rhode Island School of Design.

Early life and education 
Williams was born on September 26, 1970 in Detroit, Michigan, and she was raised in both Detroit, and in Madrid, Spain. She has earned degrees at New York University (BFA), and Cornell University (MFA).

Career 
Williams' poems have been widely anthologized, appearing in The American Poetry Review, Ploughshares, 5AM, The Crab Orchard Review, The Sun, Ms. Magazine, The Indiana Review, Callaloo, and many other publications. Additionally, Williams has performed her poems in venues throughout the country, including as a member of the 1995 Nuyorican Poets Café National Poetry Slam Team.

Williams has received grants and fellowships from the Oregon Arts Commission, the Money for Women also known as the Barbara Deming Memorial Fund, and the MacDowell Arts Colony.

Education 
Williams began teaching at Reed College as a professor of English, becoming dean for institutional diversity from 2011 to 2013. From 2013 to 2017, Williams worked at Bates College as the associate vice president for strategic initiatives and as a professor of English. In 2017, Williams came to Boston University where she first worked as the inaugural associate provost for diversity and inclusion before transferring into a broader role as vice president and associate provost for community and inclusion.

In 2021, it was announced that Williams was leaving her position as vice president and associate provost for community and inclusion at Boston University to become Rhode Island School of Design's 18th president. Williams became its first Black president on April 1, 2022.

Bibliography

Kin, Michigan State University Press, 2000.
Lunatic, Michigan State University Press, 2002.
Troubled Tongues, Lotus Press, 2009.
Detroit as Barn, University of Washington Press, 2014.

References

External links
Crystal Williams  - Interview & Poetry - April 2010
Rhode Island School of Design names 18th president - The Boston Globe - December 16, 2021

1970 births
Living people
Cornell University alumni
New York University alumni
Presidents of the Rhode Island School of Design
African-American poets
African-American academic administrators
Writers from Detroit
African-American women academic administrators
Women heads of universities and colleges